Anorostoma alternans is a species of fly in the family Heleomyzidae. The species was originally described by C.B.D. Garrett in 1925

References

Heleomyzidae
Articles created by Qbugbot
Insects described in 1925
Taxa named by C.B.D. Garrett